Thomas Hinum (born 24 July 1987) is an Austrian football player who currently plays for SKU Amstetten. He played youth soccer at St. Valentin and St. Florian.

References

External links
 
 

1987 births
Living people
Austrian footballers
Austria youth international footballers
Austria under-21 international footballers
Austrian Football Bundesliga players
FC Kärnten players
SK Rapid Wien players
SV Ried players
LASK players
FC Blau-Weiß Linz players
SKU Amstetten players
Association football midfielders